Goldbond may refer to:
Gold Bond, a skin care product
Goldbond, Virginia, a place in the United States